Mokhtar Dahmane (27 December 1931) was an Algerian professional footballer who played as a forward.

Honour

Career statistics

Club

References

1931 births
Algerian footballers
Footballers from Algiers
USM Blida players
Association football defenders
Living people
People from Blida
21st-century Algerian people
20th-century Algerian people